Arunlal Ramachandran(born 14 January 1983) is an Indian screenwriter working in Malayalam cinema. His films include Vettah and Karinkunnam 6'S.

Early life

Arunlal completed his secondary education from Mannam Memorial Residential Higher Secondary School. He completed his pre-degree course from Mar Ivanios College. His graduation was done in Govt. College, Kariavattom. Later he went to Press Club, Thiruvananthapuram and done a Post Graduation Diploma Course in Journalism.

Career

Arunlal started career as a journalist. Being a student in Trivandrum Press Club, he started a news portal. For his news portal he interviewed John Brittas. John Brittas liked the smartness of Arunlal and appointed him in Kairali TV. Being in Kairali TV, he hosted chat shows with ministers of Kerala state and celebrities from Malayalam film industry.

Later he resigned from Kairali TV and joined as assistant director in the Mohanlal film Red Chillies, directed by Shaji Kailas. 10:30 am Local Call(2013) was the first movie that penned by Arun. He also penned the movies, Thank You(2013), Happy Journey(2014), Vettah(2016), and Karinkunnam 6'S(2016).

Filmography

Personal life 

His father Adv.P.Ramachandran Nair, was the Secretary of CPI Trivandrum District Committee. His mother Mohanakumari, was a Govt.Employee. His brother Jijilal works in the United States. Arunlal is married to Danya, who won Chembai Award in 2016.

References

Malayali people
Living people
Malayalam screenwriters
1983 births
Screenwriters from Thiruvananthapuram